Frank Close (born 5 May 1963) was a Scottish footballer who played for Airdrie and Dumbarton.

References

1963 births
Scottish footballers
Dumbarton F.C. players
Airdrieonians F.C. (1878) players
Scottish Football League players
Living people
Association football defenders